Sweden: Heaven and Hell is a 1968 Italian mondo film directed, written and edited by Luigi Scattini. It features actress Marie Liljedahl and is narrated by Enrico Maria Salerno, while the English dub is provided by British actor Edmund Purdom, and the French version by Jean Topart.

The film is made up of nine segments focusing on different aspects of sexuality in Sweden, such as lesbian nightclubs, pornography, the swinging lifestyle of married couples, and the sex education of teenagers. It also examines drug addiction, alcoholism and suicides in Sweden.

The film also featured the debut of the song "Mah Nà Mah Nà" by Piero Umiliani, later made famous by Samir Ghanem and The Muppets.

External links
 
 

1968 films
1960s Italian films
1960s English-language films
1960s Italian-language films
1960s Swedish-language films
Italian documentary films
English-language Italian films
Films directed by Luigi Scattini
Films scored by Piero Umiliani
Films scored by Alessandro Alessandroni
Films set in Sweden
Films shot in Sweden
Mondo films
Embassy Pictures films